Anthony Quinn Pullard (born June 23, 1966) is an American retired professional basketball player born in DeQuincy, Louisiana. He was a 6'10" (2.08 cm) 235 lb (111 kg) forward and played collegiately at McNeese State University from 1985 to 1990. He also attended Odessa Junior College but did not play competitive basketball. He was named Sports Illustrated Player of the Week for March 5, 1990, after averaging 27.7 points and 13.3 rebounds in three wins, highlighted by a 35-point, 18-rebound performance in a 60–54 victory over North Texas on March 3, 1990.

Pullard signed with the Philadelphia 76ers of the NBA but was waived in July 1990. He signed with the Milwaukee Bucks in August, 1992, and played 8 games with them in the 1992-93 season, averaging 2.1 points and 1.0 rebound per contest. He was waived in January, 1993. Days later, he was signed by the Rockford Lightning of the CBA. According to the Canadian-based Latinbasket website, Pullard last played professionally in Ciudad Victoria, Mexico, in 1999.

References

External links
Anthony Pullard NBA stats, basketballreference.com
Anthony Pullard college stats, sportsstats.com

1966 births
Living people
African-American basketball players
American expatriate basketball people in Argentina
American expatriate basketball people in Belgium
American expatriate basketball people in Mexico
American expatriate basketball people in Portugal
American expatriate basketball people in Spain
American expatriate basketball people in Turkey
American expatriate basketball people in Uruguay
American men's basketball players
Basketball players from Louisiana
CB Girona players
Leuven Bears players
Liga ACB players
McNeese Cowboys basketball players
Milwaukee Bucks players
People from DeQuincy, Louisiana
Power forwards (basketball)
Rockford Lightning players
Undrafted National Basketball Association players
21st-century African-American people
20th-century African-American sportspeople